|}
Matthew Escott Conlan (born 1968) is an Australian politician. He was a Country Liberal Party member of the Northern Territory Legislative Assembly from 2007 to 2016, having won his seat of Greatorex in a 2007 by-election. He held several ministerial portfolios in the Mills and Giles Ministries, including Minister for Tourism, Minister for Sport, Minister for Arts and Minister for Housing. He was also the Minister for Transport and Minister for Infrastructure from December 2014. On 10 February 2015, Conlan resigned from all his cabinet positions, citing family reasons.

References

1968 births
Living people
Members of the Northern Territory Legislative Assembly
Country Liberal Party members of the Northern Territory Legislative Assembly
Australian radio personalities
21st-century Australian politicians